The 2019 DFL-Supercup was the tenth edition of the German super cup under the name DFL-Supercup, an annual football match contested by the winners of the previous season's Bundesliga and DFB-Pokal competitions. The match was played on 3 August 2019.

The DFL-Supercup featured the runners-up of the 2018–19 Bundesliga, Borussia Dortmund, and Bayern Munich, the champions of the Bundesliga and winners of the 2018–19 DFB-Pokal. Heading into the match, Bayern were the three-time defending champions of the DFL-Supercup. The match was hosted by Borussia Dortmund at the Signal Iduna Park in Dortmund.

Borussia Dortmund won the match 2–0 to secure their sixth German super cup title.

Teams
In the following table, matches until 1996 were in the DFB-Supercup era, since 2010 were in the DFL-Supercup era.

Background

Match

Details

Statistics

See also
2018–19 Bundesliga
2018–19 DFB-Pokal

Notes

References

External links

2018
2019–20 in German football cups
Borussia Dortmund matches
FC Bayern Munich matches
Dfl-Supercup
Sports competitions in Dortmund
21st century in Dortmund